Beaufortia anisandra, commonly known as dark beaufortia, is a plant in the myrtle family Myrtaceae, and is endemic to the southwest of Western Australia. It is a densely branched shrub with egg-shaped, upward pointing leaves and which bears heads of dark bluish-purple to red flowers with stamen bundles of different lengths. It is reported to have an unpleasant odour.

Description

The flowers are red to dark purplish red and are arranged in roughly spherical heads on the ends of branches that continue to grow after flowering. The flowers have 5 sepals, 5 petals and 5 bundles of stamens. The stamens are joined for most of their length, with about 3 separate filaments extending beyond the joined part. The variation is stamen length in the individual flowers is a distinguishing feature of this beaufortia.

Its occurrence at Cape Riche was noted in 1854 by William Henry Harvey ("Dr. Harvey") who wrote: "It always reminds me of Sir Francis B., because I remember your telling me that he likes a plant to have a bad smell rather than none at all; and this namesake of his would surely please him, for it has an awful stench."

Taxonomy and naming
Beaufortia anisandra was first formally described in 1843 by Johannes Conrad Schauer in Dissertatio phytographica de Regelia, Beaufortia et Calothamno. The specific epithet (anisandra) means "unequal male", referring to the length of the stamens.

Distribution and habitat
Beaufortia anisandra mainly occurs near Albany and Esperance in the Avon Wheatbelt, Esperance Plains and Jarrah Forest bioregions of south-western Western Australia. It grows in sand and rocky quartzite soils on hills, rocky outcrops and plains.

Conservation
Beaufortia anisandra is classified as "not threatened" by the Western Australian Government Department of Biodiversity, Conservation and Attractions.

References

anisandra
Plants described in 1843
Taxa named by Johannes Conrad Schauer
Endemic flora of Western Australia